Mazaalai was a Mongolian nanosatellite CubeSat that was launched into space on 3 June 2017 as part of the SpaceX CRS-11 mission.

Released into space from the Nanoracks CubeSat Deployer on the Kibō module of the International Space Station on 7 July 2017, Mazaalai was the first Mongolian satellite in space. It had imaging capabilities and could transmit songs back to Earth, but its primary mission involved performing experiments including GPS location, air density measurement, and investigation of cosmic radiation. The mission ended when the satellite deorbited 11 May 2019.

Background 
Mazaalai was part of the Birds-1 constellation of satellites, built through the Joint Global Multi-Nation Birds Satellite at Japan's Kyushu Institute of Technology (KIT), a program intended to help universities in non-spacefaring countries get satellites into space. The Birds-1 constellation also included satellites from Japan, Ghana, Nigeria, and Bangladesh. Over a two-year period, three university students from each of the five participating countries learned skills to build, develop, launch and operate the satellites. All five satellites were identical to each other. The satellites from Ghana (GhanaSat-1) and Bangladesh (BRAC Onnesha) were the first satellites in space for those countries.

MongolSat-1, which was launched in early 2017, is sometimes reported as Mongolia's first satellite, but that satellite was in fact launched by a Bermuda-based company, ABS. It was manufactured by the United States company Boeing and was co-branded as MongolSat-1 after launch.

Design 
Mazaalai was named after the endangered Gobi bear, native to Mongolia. It was designed and built by three young researchers of the National University of Mongolia, in collaboration with students from Ghana, Japan, Bangladesh, and Nigeria.

It was equipped with 0.3 megapixel and 5 megapixel cameras, capable of taking images with  resolution, and had sensors capable of measuring air density and space radiation. The satellite could also transmit songs and data at 437 MHz to Earth that had been uploaded to the satellite.

Mission

Launch 
Mazaalai was sent to the International Space Station on 3 June 2017 as part of the SpaceX CRS-11 mission. The satellite was carried in a Dragon spacecraft on a Falcon 9 rocket, launched from NASA's Kennedy Space Center, LC-39A. This was the 100th launch from LC-39A and the first time SpaceX reused one of its Dragon capsules. The satellite was released into orbit from the Japanese Kibō module of the ISS on 7 July 2017.

Operations 
The satellite performed experiments including GPS location, air density measurements, and investigating cosmic radiation. The satellite transmitted the national anthem of Mongolia to Earth. The main purpose of the project for Mongolia was to develop more accurate maps, help mitigate natural disasters, and conduct independent space studies. The project was supported by Mongolian Emergency Organization of Government and National University of Mongolia as part of the Joint Global Multi-Nation Birds Satellite project of Kyushu Institute of Technology (KIT), an international interdisciplinary project for non-space faring countries supported by Japan. The satellite communicated with seven ground stations: one in each of the countries participating in the Birds-1 program, and one each in Thailand and Taiwan.

The satellite deorbited on 11 May 2019.

Future work 
A second satellite launch in 2018 was planned by the Mazaalai team members. Japan's work with non-spacefaring countries continues with the Philippines, Bhutan, and Malaysia through Birds-2, launched on 29 June 2018 along with SpaceX CRS-15.

References

External links 
 Official Birds website

2017 in Mongolia
Satellites orbiting Earth
CubeSats
First artificial satellites of a country
Science and technology in Mongolia
National University of Mongolia
Spacecraft launched in 2017
Student satellites
Satellites deployed from the International Space Station
Spacecraft which reentered in 2019